Futian station is a station on the Guangzhou–Shenzhen–Hong Kong Express Rail Link, and the final station in mainland China before trains enter Hong Kong. Futian District is in southern Shenzhen, where the central business district is located. The station opened on 28 June 2011 serving the Shenzhen Metro, and since 30 December 2015 it has been the first underground high speed railway station on a long-distance line in China. It serves as an interchange station between the Guangzhou–Shenzhen–Hong Kong Express Rail Link and Line 2, Line 3 and Line 11 of the Shenzhen Metro.

The first level underground is a concourse for reaching both the metro trains and the high speed intercity trains. Passenger lounges and customs and immigration facilities are located here. The second and third underground levels serve Shenzhen Metro trains. At the fourth underground level are the platforms for China Railway High-speed (CRH) intercity trains arriving from Guangzhou and cities farther along the line.

Station size and locations served
Futian station is located between Fuzhong 3rd Road and Shennan Road, in Futian District, Shenzhen in Guangdong Province of the People's Republic of China. It is the second largest underground railway station in Asia, and the largest high-speed railway station to be built completely underground worldwide. The only underground railway station larger than Futian station is Grand Central Terminal in New York City. The station covers 147,000 square meters.

Futian station offers intercity connections on the high speed train lines to Guangzhou, Changsha, Wuhan, Zhengzhou and Beijing. This station serves as the terminus of many high-speed intercity services from across Mainland China. It is also a station for the Shenzhen Metro, serving the Futian District.

Connection to Hong Kong
High-speed trains provide regional service linking the Futian Central Business District with Kowloon, Hong Kong, after completion of the construction on 23 September 2018. It reduced travel time to only 15 minutes, quicker than the 45-minute journey via the Hong Kong MTR. High-speed rail services by 'G' numbered Intercity trains travel to Beijing in about 9 hours from Hong Kong.

Intercity service and travel time
CRH service to Futian started operation on 30 December 2015. Its completion reduces the travel time by railway between central Shenzhen and Guangzhou to about 50 minutes.

Structure
As Asia's largest underground railway station, it is 1023m long and 78.86m wide, constructed by open-cut method to a depth of 32m. It consists of three subterranean levels. The first level underground is a transfer concourse allowing for access to both the Metro services and high-speed long-distance trains. Business and VIP lounges are available, plus customs and immigration facilities for cross border services to Hong Kong.

The second level underground contains the Shenzhen Metro concourse, which allows for access to Line 2, Line 3, and Line 11.

The lowest level is where the high-speed train platforms are located. Vibrant Express shuttle services to Hong Kong's West Kowloon railway station will separated from long-distance services to such destinations as Beijing and Shanghai.

High Speed Rail

Shenzhen Metro

Exits

See also
 Shenzhen North station
 Hong Kong West Kowloon railway station
 Guangzhou–Shenzhen–Hong Kong Express Rail Link

References

External links
 Shenzhen Metro Futian Station (Line 2) (Chinese)
 Shenzhen Metro Futian Station (Line 2) (English)
 Shenzhen Metro Futian Station (Line 3) (Chinese)
 Shenzhen Metro Futian Station (Line 3) (English)
 Shenzhen Metro Futian Station (Line 11) (Chinese)
 Shenzhen Metro Futian Station (Line 11) (English)

Railway stations in Shenzhen
Railway stations in China opened in 2015
Shenzhen Metro stations
Railway stations in Guangdong
Futian District
Railway stations in China opened in 2011